Trinity Episcopal Church is a historic Episcopal church located in Portsmouth, Virginia. It was built between 1828 and 1830, and is a stuccoed brick building.  It has an attached bell tower. Also on the property is the contributing parish house, built in 1887.  During the American Civil War, the church was used as a hospital.

Rt.Rev. C. Charles Vaché, who served as its rector for 19 years before becoming the Bishop of Southern Virginia, wrote a history of the parish.

It was listed on the National Register of Historic Places in 1973. It is located in the Downtown Portsmouth Historic District.

References

External links
Trinity Episcopal Church website

19th-century Episcopal church buildings
Churches on the National Register of Historic Places in Virginia
Churches completed in 1830
Churches in Portsmouth, Virginia
Episcopal churches in Virginia
National Register of Historic Places in Portsmouth, Virginia
Individually listed contributing properties to historic districts on the National Register in Virginia
1830 establishments in Virginia